İncirgediği is a village in Tarsus district of Mersin Province, Turkey. It is on to the east of Turkish state highway . The population of village was 166 as of 2012.

References

Villages in Tarsus District